William Clark Falkner (July 6, 1825 or 1826 – November 6, 1889) was a military veteran, businessman, and author in northern Mississippi. He is most notable for the influence he had on the work of his great-grandson, author William Faulkner.

Family background

He was born in Knox County, Tennessee, to Joseph Falkner (or Forkner or Faulkner) and Caroline Word (or Ward). Both Caroline's paternal grandfather Charles and his brother Cuthbert died during the American Revolutionary War while serving under the command of George Washington.  Her father Thomas Adams Word moved the family to Georgia in 1812. Caroline's sister Justianna Dickinson Word married John Wesley Thompson, who in 1834 was arrested for killing a man during a fight. He was acquitted, and afterwards moved with Justianna to Ripley, Mississippi. Thompson eventually became a district attorney, and later a district judge, in Mississippi.

William Clark Falkner lived with his family in Ste. Genevieve, Missouri and Pontotoc, Mississippi, joining the Thompsons in Ripley in 1842. In 1847, he married Holland Pearce. Their only child John Wesley Thompson Falkner, named after WC's uncle, was born in 1848. Holland died in 1849. Elizabeth Houston Vance (1833–1910) became his second wife in 1851. They were the parents of eight children:

William Henry Falkner (1853–1878) - son
Willett Medora Falkner Carter (1856–1918) - daughter
Thomas Vance Falkner (1859–1861) - son
Lizzie Manassah Falkner (1861–1861) - daughter
Fannie Forest Falkner Dogan (1866–1929) - daughter
Effie Falkner Davis (1868–1957) - daughter
Alabama Leroy Falkner McLean (1874–1968) - daughter
Unknown (died young)

Military service

He served in the Mexican–American War as First Lieutenant of the 2nd Regiment of Mississippi Volunteers. When the American Civil War broke out, he raised a company of men and was made colonel in the Second Mississippi Infantry of the Confederate Army. Later, he was demoted in an election of officers; and formed a unit known as the 1st Mississippi Partisan Rangers. He never regained a prominent role in the Confederate Army, but he was forever known as "Colonel Falkner" or just "The Old Colonel" after the war.

Later life and death

During Reconstruction, he was active in rebuilding northern Mississippi and founded the Ship Island, Ripley, and Kentucky Railroad Company. The first station on the line north of Ripley was located in what is now the community of Falkner.

On November 5, 1889, he was shot by Richard Jackson Thurmond, a former business partner. The motive for the shooting was believed to have been a lingering grudge dating back to their partnership. Falkner had just been elected to serve in the Mississippi legislature. He died the next day.

Literary works

Falkner was also an author, writing novels, poems, a travelogue, and at least one play. His most famous work was a novel entitled The White Rose of Memphis (New York, G. W. Carleton & co.; 1881), a murder mystery set on board a steamboat of the same name. This work was popular enough to be reprinted several times through the early 20th century, selling over 160,000 copies.  

Partial source: Mississippi Writers and Musicians

{{}
The Life and Confession of A. J. MacCannon, Murderer of the Adcock Family (1845)

The Lost Diamond (1867)

Influence
WC Falkner's oldest child John Wesley Thompson Falkner was the father of Murry Cuthbert Falkner. Murry's oldest child was Nobel laureate author William Faulkner. As a child, William (who later changed his surname to Faulkner) reportedly said, "I want to be a writer like my great-granddaddy." The elder Falkner served as the model for the character of Colonel John Sartoris, who appeared in the novels Sartoris (1929; reissued in an expanded edition as Flags in the Dust, 1973) and The Unvanquished (1938), as well as a number of short stories. Thus, Colonel Falkner is the inspiration for an integral part of the history of Faulkner's fictional Yoknapatawpha County. Faulkner's short story "Knight's Gambit" (in the 1949 collection Knight's Gambit) has been viewed as including a commentary on Falkner's The White Rose of Memphis (1881).

Bibliography

References

External links
 
 
 

1820s births
1889 deaths
People from Knox County, Tennessee
19th-century American railroad executives
American military personnel of the Mexican–American War
19th-century American novelists
American travel writers
Deaths by firearm in Mississippi
Confederate States Army officers
Businesspeople from Mississippi
Members of the Mississippi Legislature
People from Ste. Genevieve, Missouri
People from Pontotoc, Mississippi
People murdered in Mississippi
Male murder victims
People of Mississippi in the American Civil War
William Faulkner
19th-century American poets
American male novelists
American male poets
People from Ripley, Mississippi
American male non-fiction writers
Writers from Missouri
Writers from Mississippi